State Road 494 (NM 494) is a  state highway in the US state of New Mexico. NM 494's southern terminus is a continuation of Banner Mine Road at the southern city border of Lordsburg, and the northern terminus is at U.S. Route 70 (US 70) and Interstate 10 Business (I-10 Bus.) in Lordsburg.

Major intersections

See also

References

494
Transportation in Hidalgo County, New Mexico